Harvey Lee Catchings (born September 2, 1951) is an American former professional basketball player.

He played in the National Basketball Association (NBA) from 1974 to 1985 as a member of the Philadelphia 76ers, New Jersey Nets, Milwaukee Bucks, and Los Angeles Clippers. He has NBA career averages of 3.2 points per game, 5.0 rebounds per game and 1.6 blocks per game. On December 18, 1976, Catchings scored a career-high 16 points alongside grabbing 11 rebounds in a 97–93 victory over the Indiana Pacers. On April 10, 1981, Catchings blocked 5 shots in only 16 minutes during Game 3 of the Eastern Conference Semifinals, a loss against the Philadelphia 76ers.

He is one of 43 NBA players to have recorded at least 10 blocks in a single game. In his career, he made the Eastern Conference Finals three times (once with Philadelphia, twice with Milwaukee) and made the NBA Finals once with Philadelphia during the 1976-77 NBA season.

Catchings is the all-time leader of Defensive Box Plus/Minus in Bucks franchise history at 2.6, above defensive greats such as Kareem Abdul-Jabbar, Giannis Antetokounmpo, and Alvin Robertson.

NBA career statistics

|-
| style="text-align:left" | 1974–75
| style="text-align:left" | Philadelphia
| 37 || – || 14.3 || .554 || – || .640 || 4.1 || 0.6 || 0.3 || 1.6 || 2.6
|-
| style="text-align:left" | 1975–76
| style="text-align:left" | Philadelphia
| 75 || – || 23.1 || .426 || – || .604 || 6.9 || 0.8 || 0.3 || 2.2 || 3.5
|-
| style="text-align:left" | 1976–77
| style="text-align:left" | Philadelphia
| 53 || 25 || 16.3 || .504 || – || .702 || 4.4 || 0.6 || 0.4 || 1.5 || 3.0
|-
| style="text-align:left" | 1977–78
| style="text-align:left" | Philadelphia
| 61 || 2 || 12.3 || .393 || – || .618 || 4.1 || 0.6 || 0.3 || 1.1 || 2.9
|-
| style="text-align:left" | 1978–79
| style="text-align:left" | Philadelphia
| 25 || 4 || 11.6 || .412 || – || .765 || 3.9 || 0.7 || 0.3 || 1.4 || 2.8
|-
| style="text-align:left" | 1978–79
| style="text-align:left" | New Jersey
| 32 || – || 20.6 || .423 || – || .770 || 6.4 || 0.9 || 0.5 || 1.8 || 6.1
|-
| style="text-align:left" | 1979–80
| style="text-align:left" | Milwaukee
| 72 || – || 19.0 || .398 || .000 || .629 || 5.7 || 1.1 || 0.3 || 2.3 || 3.2
|-
| style="text-align:left" | 1980–81
| style="text-align:left" | Milwaukee
| 77 || – || 21.2 || .447 || .000 || .641 || 6.1 || 1.3 || 0.4 || 2.4 || 4.2
|-
| style="text-align:left" | 1981–82
| style="text-align:left" | Milwaukee
| 80 || 9 || 20.0 || .420 || .000 || .594 || 4.5 || 1.2 || 0.5 || 1.7 || 2.9
|-
| style="text-align:left" | 1982–83
| style="text-align:left" | Milwaukee
| 74 || 33 || 21.0 || .457 || .000 || .674 || 5.5 || 1.0 || 0.4 || 2.0 || 3.3
|-
| style="text-align:left" | 1983–84
| style="text-align:left" | Milwaukee
| 69 || 3 || 16.8 || .399 || .000 || .524 || 3.9 || 0.6 || 0.4 || 1.2 || 2.1
|-
| style="text-align:left" | 1984–85
| style="text-align:left" | Los Angeles
| 70 || 14 || 15.0 || .483 || .000 || .663 || 3.7 || 0.2 || 0.2 || 0.8 || 2.9
|- class="sortbottom"
| style="text-align:center;" colspan="2"| Career
| 725 || 90 || 18.2 || .435 || .000 || .647 || 5.0 || 0.8 || 0.4 || 1.7 || 3.2
|}

Playoffs

|-
| style="text-align:left" | 1975–76
| style="text-align:left" | Philadelphia
| 3 || – || 29.0 || .615 || – || .333 || 9.3 || 2.0 || 0.0 || 3.0 || 5.7
|-
| style="text-align:left" | 1976–77
| style="text-align:left" | Philadelphia
| 8 || – || 6.8 || .400 || – || .000 || 1.5 || 0.1 || 0.0 || 0.5 || 0.5
|-
| style="text-align:left" | 1977–78
| style="text-align:left" | Philadelphia
| 7 || – || 3.7 || .375 || – || .750 || 1.3 || 0.0 || 0.1 || 0.4 || 1.3
|-
| style="text-align:left" | 1978–79
| style="text-align:left" | New Jersey
| 2 || – || 13.0 || .167 || – || .000 || 4.0 || 0.5 || 0.0 || 0.5 || 1.0
|-
| style="text-align:left" | 1979–80
| style="text-align:left" | Milwaukee
| 6 || – || 10.7 || .333 || .000 || .500 || 3.5 || 0.3 || 0.0 || 1.3 || 1.0
|-
| style="text-align:left" | 1980–81
| style="text-align:left" | Milwaukee
| 7 || – || 15.6 || .188 || .000 || 1.000 || 3.7 || 1.1 || 0.0 || 1.6 || 1.1
|-
| style="text-align:left" | 1981–82
| style="text-align:left" | Milwaukee
| 6 || – || 4.3 || .667 || .000 || .000 || 1.2 || 0.0 || 0.0 || 0.5 || 0.7
|-
| style="text-align:left" | 1982–83
| style="text-align:left" | Milwaukee
| 9 || – || 15.4 || .474 || .000 || 1.000 || 4.2 || 0.4 || 0.2 || 1.1 || 2.3
|-
| style="text-align:left" | 1983–84
| style="text-align:left" | Milwaukee
| 5 || – || 5.0 || .500 || .000 || .500 || 1.0 || 0.2 || 0.0 || 0.0 || 0.6
|- class="sortbottom"
| style="text-align:center;" colspan="2"| Career
| 53 || – || 10.5 || .397 || .000 || .500 || 2.9 || 0.4 || 0.1 || 0.9 || 1.4
|}

Personal life
Catchings is the father of WNBA former star Tamika Catchings, who played for the Indiana Fever. Catchings is currently a Reverse Mortgage Consultant with Open Mortgage-North Houston.

Both Harvey, and his daughter Tamika, identify as Christian.

Catchings was friends with former 76ers teammate Joe Bryant, and both of their families spent time together while they each played professional basketball in Italy. Because of this, Catchings' children were childhood friends with Joe's son, Kobe Bryant.

See also
List of National Basketball Association players with most blocks in a game

References

External links
NBA statistics at basketball-reference.com

1951 births
Living people
African-American basketball players
American expatriate basketball people in Italy
American men's basketball players
Basketball players from Jackson, Mississippi
Chicago Bulls announcers
Hardin–Simmons Cowboys basketball players
Junior college men's basketball players in the United States
Los Angeles Clippers players
Milwaukee Bucks players
New Jersey Nets players
Nuova Pallacanestro Gorizia players
Philadelphia 76ers draft picks
Philadelphia 76ers players
Utah Stars draft picks
Centers (basketball)
Power forwards (basketball)
21st-century African-American people
20th-century African-American sportspeople